Jaroslav Jeroným Neduha (born 7 August 1945 in Česká Lípa) is a Czech singer-songwriter. In 1967, he appeared in Juraj Herz's film Kulhavý ďábel and subsequently became a professional actor of small roles. He then starred in several other films including Jiří Suchý's Nevěsta where he also sang. He formed Extempore in 1970, originally a folk band that later transformed into a rock band (1974). He left the band 1978. In 1983, he was forced to leave Czechoslovakia. He then lived in Vienna until 1990 when he returned to Czechoslovakia and reformed Extempore. In 2016, he released his memoirs Životaběh.

He is the older brother of Jiří Neduha.

References

External links 

1945 births
Living people
Czech guitarists
Male guitarists
Czechoslovak male singers
People from Česká Lípa
20th-century Czech male singers